Tiadenol is a hypolipidemic agent.

References 

Thioethers
Diols
Hypolipidemic agents